The 2008 NRL season was the 101st season of professional rugby league club competition in Australia, and the eleventh run by the National Rugby League. For the second year, sixteen teams competed for the 2008 Telstra Premiership title. The season commenced with the first matches played on 14 March and ended with the Grand Final, played on 5 October. The premiership was won by the Manly Warringah Sea Eagles who set the record for the highest Grand Final victory in Australia's rugby league history.

2008 also marked the launch of the National Youth Competition, an under 20 competition running parallel to the senior competition under the sponsorship name, the Toyota Cup.

Centenary of rugby league
Rugby league was first introduced into Australia in 1907, with a meeting in Sydney on 8 August 1908 effectively forming a new breakaway league from the New South Wales Rugby Union. The new body was known as the New South Wales Rugby Football League, and became the first professional sporting code in Australia. In the following months, eight Sydney-based teams were formed and signed up to play in the New South Wales Rugby Football League's premiership, with another club joining a week into competition.

The New South Wales Rugby League continued to run the competition up until and including 1994 when it passed on responsibility to the Australian Rugby League, the national authority for rugby league in Australia. In 1997 a rival Super League competition run by News Limited was started and signed up several existing teams from the Australian Rugby League. After both bodies lost a lot of money that year, a truce was signed and a new competition was formed for the 1998 season, under the brand name "National Rugby League."

Regarded as the spiritual home of rugby league in Australia, Birchgrove Oval hosted the official launch of the NRL's 2008 Centenary rugby league season. During the season, the NRL staged a number of celebrations marking the 100th anniversary of the sport in Australia. The opening match of the 2008 season was held between the remaining two "foundation clubs" from 1908, the Sydney Roosters and the South Sydney Rabbitohs. A 'Heritage round' was introduced to coincide with the 100th anniversary of the first round of competition in the New South Wales Rugby League, whereby teams faced opponents that entered the competition in similar time frames.

Several events took place to celebrate the 100th anniversary of landmark moments in rugby league in Australia. These events began in August 2007 with a re-enactment of the meeting which led to the formation of the New South Wales Rugby League, essentially the beginning of rugby league in Australia. In January and February 2008, several of the foundation clubs, the Newtown Jets, South Sydney Rabbitohs, Balmain Tigers, Sydney Roosters, North Sydney Bears and Western Suburbs Magpies, hosted special functions at the places they were officially formed.

Season summary

Schedule

The 2008 season was one week longer than the 2007 competition, allowing an extra bye on top of the existing one allocated to each club. In addition, the scheduling of the earlier representative fixtures was changed, including the removal of Monday Night Football on weekends prior to the City vs Country match and the ANZAC Test. The City vs Country fixture was pushed back to Friday night where it had been prior to 2007. Many of these initiatives were announced midway through the 2007 season by the chief executive officer of the National Rugby League, David Gallop, in an attempt to help reduce player fatigue after several complaints of player injuries caused by the short turnaround between some matches.

2008 also saw a change in how the draw is devised, with teams nominating their preferred home opponents in order of preference. The NRL consulted these requests when structuring the season's fixtures. This change is intended to maximise attendances by allowing local derbies and other high-interest matches to be played twice a year. It is a departure from previous methods, which focused on trying to produce an equally difficult playing schedule for each club. The draw was released on 19 October 2007.

On the back of increasing public pressure, the National Rugby League decided to move the Grand Final back from the later timeslot of 7:00pm to 5:00pm. The Grand Final had traditionally been held on a Sunday afternoon up until 2000, after which it was relocated to the evening in order to accommodate the Channel 9's programming desires. Whilst the late night scheduling was not considered as much an issue for New South Wales audiences because of the Labour Day public holiday the following day, it was argued by many Queenslanders that such a time was unsuitable for families on the eve of a weekday. Many individuals in the general public and the media pushed for a full return to a 3:00pm kickoff time where it had been for many decades, whilst Channel 9 continued to insist on 7:00pm. As a compromise, the National Rugby League decided on a "twilight" match starting at 5:00pm. It was the first time since the 2000 season that the grand final was played in daylight, largely due to a change in commencement of Daylight Saving Time in New South Wales, ACT and Victoria in 2008.

Teams
The number of teams in the NRL remained unchanged since the previous season, with sixteen participating in the regular season: ten from New South Wales, three from Queensland and one from each of Victoria, the Australian Capital Territory and New Zealand. Of the ten from New South Wales, eight (St. George Illawarra are both from Sydney and Wollongong) are from Sydney's metropolitan area, with (St. George Illawarra being a Sydney and Wollongong joint venture. Just two foundation clubs from New South Wales Rugby League season 1908 played in this competition: the Sydney Roosters (formerly known as Eastern Suburbs) and the South Sydney Rabbitohs. The Melbourne Storm were the defending premiers.

For the first time since the 1988 introduction of teams outside of New South Wales, an under-20 competition ran incorporating sides fielded by each of the sixteen premiership clubs. The National Youth Competition, known as the Toyota Cup for sponsorship purposes was solely for under-20 players.

Records set in 2008

Gold Coast Titans winger Jordan Atkins matched the standing record for most tries in a first grade debut set by Canterbury Bankstown's Tony Nash in season 1942 when he scored four tries in round 1 of 2008.
The Brisbane Broncos set a new club home attendance record for a regular season game at Suncorp Stadium when 50,612 spectators attended their Round 3 match against the North Queensland Cowboys. However, this did not beat their all-time club record of 58,583 set at their former home ANZ Stadium (Brisbane) (1993-2003) in Round 22 of the 1993 season against the St. George Dragons.
The Bulldogs set a club home crowd record when 36,526 spectators attended their Round 4 clash against the Sydney Roosters. The match marked Roosters forward Willie Mason's first match against his old club, and also set a record for the highest attended club match in Sydney during a premiership season (excluding finals).
Ruben Wiki became only the 10th player in history to play 300 first grade games, and is the first New Zealander to pass this milestone.
The South Sydney Rabbitohs equalled the 2nd biggest comeback in NRL history in Round 16 against the North Queensland Cowboys. After trailing 28–4 after fifty minutes, the Rabbitohs won the match 29–28.
The North Queensland Cowboys recorded their longest losing streak of 13 matches (round 7–21)
Melbourne Storm became the first club to win three minor premierships in a row (and also three minor premierships overall) since the founding of the NRL, but these titles have since been stripped by the NRL as a result of gross salary cap infringements.
The New Zealand Warriors became the first eighth-placed club to win in the first week of the finals since the McIntyre Final 8 System was introduced in season 1999. They progressed to the preliminary final, the furthest stage that any 8th-placed team has progressed. This record stood for 12 months, when the 8th-placed team from the following season, the Parramatta Eels, went one better and made the grand final.
The Manly Warringah Sea Eagles' Grand Final defeat of defending premiers Melbourne Storm, 40–0, is the greatest winning margin in a Grand Final, eclipsing the record set in 1975 which was Eastern Suburbs 38–0 win over St. George Dragons. The last team to be kept scoreless in a Grand Final was Cronulla in 1978 in the grand final replay against Manly 16–0.

Marketing

Sponsorship
For the eighth straight season the National Rugby League's maintained its naming rights sponsor Telstra with the competition again known as the Telstra Premiership. In addition to the Telstra Premiership logo appearing over the right upper chest on each team's playing jersey, the "Centenary of Rugby league in Australia" logo was displayed just above to commemorate the competition's centenary.

Following their successful sponsorship of "Friday Night Football" in 2007, the Foster's Group decided to change the specific brand sponsorship from their Carlton Draught product to now represent Victoria Bitter. Harvey Norman continued its sponsorship of the State of Origin series while AAMI also continued its association with the annual City vs Country Origin clash. Additionally, Bundaberg Rum maintained naming rights to both the ANZAC Test and Monday Night Football.

Throughout the season, various charities and other non-profit organisations received exposure on Sunday Football through Rugby League's One Community Program.

Advertising
In celebration of the code's 100th anniversary the NRL and its ad agency MJW created for 2008 a Centenary Tribute ad which used historical footage of games and stars of yesteryear, blending in with action sequences of the modern day. Original epic orchestral music was used as the soundtrack. The ad opened with still imagery from 1908 to the modern day juxtaposed and rolling as though an ensemble of players are entering the Sydney Cricket Ground from the dressing rooms in the Members Stand.

The morphed film segments included a 1930s Australia v England Test with modern Australian players in the backline; Wayne Pearce in the 1980s on the sideline at the Sydney Cricket Ground next to a mud covered 1960s player and a sequence where Darren Lockyer circa 2000 takes a pass from Clive Churchill circa 1950. Clever touches include Dragons Mark Gasnier backing up his uncle Reg Gasnier some 40 years apart; Sharks stars of different generations, Steve Rogers and Andrew Ettingshausen running together and Souths' Craig Wing in 2008 putting Ron Coote through a gap in 1968. The final shot shows the 2008 version of Norm Provan and Arthur Summons covered head to toe in mud & recreating the "Gladiators" image from the 1963 Grand Final acknowledged by the 2007 Grand Finalists Cameron Smith and Greg Inglis in front of iconic images of Grand Finals gone by including John Sattler being chaired from the field in 1971 while Brad Fittler celebrates his 2002 win and Bradley Clyde his 1994 premiership.<ref>https://www.youtube.com/watch?v=BuhCPjvn83Y</ 2008 Centenary tribute ad</ref>

Regular season

Bold – Home game
X – Bye
* – Golden point game
Opponent for round listed above margin

Ladder

For the first time since the 1999 season, the team finishing in 8th spot won more games than it had lost. It should be also noted that on that occasion, 17 teams were in the competition.

Finals series

The National Rugby League employs the McIntyre final eight system and, for the second year running, preliminary finals were allowed to be played outside of Sydney.
The Manly Warringah Sea Eagles recorded the biggest winning Grand Final margin in Australia's rugby league history after defeating the Melbourne Storm 40–0, eclipsing the 38–0 score line set by Eastern Suburbs over St. George Dragons in 1975.
The New Zealand Warriors became the first 8th-placed team to beat the 1st placed Minor Premiers since the McIntyre final eight system came into the competition in 1999 by beating the Melbourne Storm 18–15, scoring a match winning try with only three minutes remaining.
The Brisbane Broncos won their first Qualifying Finals match since 2002.

Finals chart

Grand Final

Player records
In 2008 New Zealand's Ruben Wiki was the oldest player in the NRL at 35 years and 250 days. Sam Perrett ran 3,720 metres with the ball in 2008, more than any other player in the competition.

Top 5 point scorers

Top 5 try scorers

2008 Transfers

Players

Related links

2008 NRL season results
2008 NRL Under-20s season
2008 Dally M Awards

2008 representative games
City vs Country Origin
ANZAC Centenary Test
State of Origin 2008
2008 Rugby League World Cup

Team season articles
Brisbane Broncos 2008
Bulldogs season 2008
Canberra Raiders season 2008
Cronulla-Sutherland Sharks 2008
Manly-Warringah Sea Eagles 2008
Melbourne Storm 2008
North Queensland Cowboys season 2008
Sydney Roosters season 2008
Wests Tigers 2008

Notes

References

 
National Rugby League. Centenary – The revolution of rugby National Rugby League. 8 August 2007. Retrieved on 13 August 2007.
National Rugby League. Centenary grass roots celebrations National Rugby League. 8 August 2007. Retrieved on 13 August 2007.
Australian Associated Press. Quayle back for momentous day in league National Rugby League. 8 August 2007. Retrieved on 13 August 2007.
Australian Associated Press. Rugby League exhibit at National Museum National Rugby League. 8 August 2007. Retrieved on 13 August 2007.
Australian Associated Press. Kangaroos to meet NZ in centenary test National Rugby League. 8 August 2007. Retrieved on 13 August 2007.
National Rugby League. League Still Making History 100 Years On National Rugby League. 8 August 2007. Retrieved on 13 August 2007.

External links
Rugby League Centenary Exhibit at nma.gov.au